Call of Duty: Modern Warfare 3 –  Defiance is a 2011 first-person shooter video game in the Call of Duty franchise, developed by n-Space for the Nintendo DS. The game takes place in about the same setting as Call of Duty: Modern Warfare 3 and features many elements of gameplay typical to the series, including the usage of iron sights, vehicular missions, and online play. 
It is the last Call of Duty game to be rated T for Teen by the ESRB. It is also the last Call of Duty game to be released on the Nintendo DS.

Gameplay
The game features the very similar first-person shooter gameplay found in its predecessors.  However, the lower screen status display has been updated with new functions including the ability to draw a knife without first moving into melee range of an opponent.

The game offers three different single player modes, including Campaign, Quick Play, and Challenge Mode. Campaign mode features a storyline (found below). It has 14 different missions and 3 different game modes, Recruit, Regular, and Hardened. Quick Play is a mode where you can play each individual mission in any order you choose. You will have to complete the campaign to unlock all of the missions. Quick Play also features the same three difficulties. Challenge Mode consists of 10 missions and each have a goal, such as “Get 15 kills with 75% accuracy,” as from Challenge 08. It does not have a difficulty selection as the challenges get harder as you progress.

The game also has two Multiplayer modes, Local MP and Online Multiplayer. Local MP is a mode where you can play against other people in your general area, and up to 6 people can join in one game. The modes are Death Match, Team Death Match, Sabotage, Gun Game, Sharpshooter, and One in the Chamber.  You will play as either Russian Soldier or US Marine in any games with teams. In Online Multiplayer (which you can no longer play due to Nintendo Wi-Fi Connection shutting down) you can play any of the modes listed above. It was essentially the same thing as Local MP, except over internet connection.

In MP Barracks you can do two things, edit Macros or edit Loadouts. Macros are map setups that are saved to the cartridge which include the map, time limit, score limit, etc. that you can use in Local MP. Loadouts, which would use in Local MP and Online Multiplayer, consist of your primary weapon, secondary weapon, grenade, perk 1, perk 2, and your title.

Plot
Defiance does not follow the same storyline as Call of Duty: Modern Warfare 3. Like the previous Nintendo DS Call of Duty games, the storyline serves as a "companion narrative" to the console and PC versions.

The game opens with the U.S. National Guard force training in Alaska at the time of the Russians invasion that takes place halfway through Call of Duty: Modern Warfare 2. The National Guard works in conjunction with the British SFSG cross-training in the United States to resist the Russians, including holding the town of Wilton against the Russians, and securing the Trans-Alaska Pipeline System from capture.

The action then shifts to the Arizona/Nevada border, and the fighting at the Hoover Dam and surrounding Henderson, Nevada. A British force assaults the dam via helicopter, and manage to save generators powering the Nevada side, but are killed when the generators on the Arizona side are destroyed, leaving Arizona's power supply crippled.

The final part of the game takes place in Baltimore, where the National Guard and SFSG reclaim Baltimore/Washington International Thurgood Marshall Airport taken by the Russian forces, and fight through the Baltimore seaport and learn that the Russians have moved a WMD into the U.S., and are moving the weapon to a combat zone. The teams race through the port, fighting their way aboard a cargo ship where the Russians are offloading the weapon. The National Guard team makes it to the deck of the cargo vessel just as a Russian Hind helicopter carrying the weapon takes off. The teams manage to bring down the helicopter with an RPG, and the game ends as the player's C.O. states, "Now the real fight begins", referring to World War III in Modern Warfare 3.

Multiplayer
Defiance features a multiplayer mode that has been significantly improved over its predecessors, featuring the ability for players to create and save weapon loadouts, grenade options, titles and perks. Weapons are unlocked when the player had made a specified number of kills with a similar weapon, in a functionality similar to the earlier handheld Call of Duty games. Additionally, players may change loadouts whenever they respawn. Similarly, players may preset map options, and run them instantly when host.

Since Nintendo Wi-Fi Connection was shut down, Online cannot be accessed by players unless local can be accessed.

Reception

The game received mixed reviews. Official Nintendo Magazines Chris Scullion states that the game was "Not without its flaws but an impressive shooter given the limitations of the hardware." James Dawson of Nintendo World Report wrote that "Call of Duty: Modern Warfare 3: Defiance isn't going to win any awards, but as a DS port of a popular franchise, it does a decent job making the experience portable".

References

External links

Developer n-Space official website

2011 video games
Activision games
Modern Warfare 3 - Defiance
First-person shooters
First-person shooter multiplayer online games
Multiplayer online games
Nintendo DS games
Nintendo DS-only games
Nintendo Wi-Fi Connection games
War video games set in the United States
Multiplayer and single-player video games
Video games scored by Geoff Zanelli
Video games set in Alaska
Video games set in Nevada
Video games set in Arizona
Video games set in Maryland
Video games developed in the United States